Photomaton may refer to:

Photo booth, coin-operated booth designed by Anatol Josepho that was initially called "The Photomaton"
Photomaton Parent Corporation Limited, a company set up by Clarence Hatry in 1928 to operate photograph machines in hundreds of public places such as railway stations and amusement parks
"Photomaton" (song), 2013 single by French electronic act Jabberwocky

See also
"Photomaton e Vox", poetry by Herberto Hélder